Arthur Albert Brinkley Pape (30 July 1890 – 11 August 1945) was an English cricketer who played one first-class match for Somerset in 1912.

Pape batted at No 6 in both Somerset innings of the match against Northamptonshire at Bath, and did not score in either innings. Cricket websites do not indicate whether he was left or right-handed, and in his one first-class match, he did not bowl.

In 1921, he played non-first-class cricket for Durham in the Minor Counties, mostly as a middle-order batsman, but occasionally opening the innings. He scored 100 runs in eight innings, two of them not out, including his personal highest of 49 against Yorkshire Second Eleven.

External links

References

1890 births
1945 deaths
English cricketers
Somerset cricketers
Durham cricketers
People from Fairford